Hyperaulax ramagei is a species of tropical air-breathing land snail, a terrestrial pulmonate gastropod mollusk in the family Odontostomidae.

Shell description

Distribution
This terrestrial species is found on the islands Fernando de Noronha off BraziL.

References

 Breure, A. S. H., 1976. Types of Bulimulidae (Mollusca, Gastropoda) in the Muséum national d'Histoire naturelle, Paris. Bulletin du Muséum national d'Histoire naturelle 233 "1975": 1137–1187, sér. ser.3, part. Zoologie

External links 
 Jousseaume, [F.]. (1900). Mollusques terrestres. Clausilia, Rhodea et Bulimus Sud-Americanae. Bulletin de la Société Philomatique de Paris, ser. 9. 2(1): 5-44
 Salvador, R. B.; Cavallari, D. C. (2019). Taxonomic revision of the genus Hyperaulax Pilsbry, 1897 (Gastropoda, Stylommatophora, Odontostomidae). Zoosystematics and Evolution. 95(2): 453-463

Odontostomidae
Gastropods described in 1890
Taxa named by Edgar Albert Smith